Patrick Webb may refer to:
 Patrick Webb (nutritionist)
 Patrick Webb (artist)
 Paddy Webb, New Zealand trade unionist and politician